Honey Chhaya (1930 – 28 February 2016) was an Indian writer, actor and director. He directed and acted in both Hindi and Gujarati films and plays.

Life
Honey Chhaya was born in 1930. He started his acting career in 1944. Initially, he acted in street plays spreading the message of the Indian independence movement. Later, he started producing plays for the Indian People's Theatre Association. He had a long career association with Salim Khan, whom he assisted in film writing. He was also a business secretary of Salman Khan and served a critical role in building his career.

He directed several Gujarati films and plays. He brought Chhel Vayeda-Paresh Daru in production design career. He wrote a column on forensic science in Gujarati weekly; Janmabhoomi Pravasi. He acted in several TV commercials.
He died on 28 February 2016 5:45 pm at Cardinal Gracias Memorial Hospital, Vasai, Mumbai after a brief illness.

Personal life
He was married to Manisha. He had a son, Bibhas Chhaya and a daughter, Neerja. Bibhas Chhaya is associated with the film production company of Salman Khan.

Filmography

Direction
Gujarati films
 Anand Mangal
 Dada Ho Dikari

Actor
Gujarati films
 Mehndi Rang Lagyo (1960)

Hindi films
 Kahin Aar Kahin Paar (1971)
 Jaago (2004)
 Being Cyrus (2005) as Fardoonjee Sethna
 Firaaq (2008) as Bapuji
 Blue Oranges (2009) as Old Man in jail
 What's Your Raashee? (2009) as Hasmukhbhai Shukla
 Na Ghar Ke Na Ghaat Ke (2010) as an Old man
 Tum Milo Toh Sahi (2010) as Nani Anjuman
 Dabangg (2010) as Old Man - Item Song
 OMG – Oh My God! (2012) as Jagdeesh Bhai
 Monsoon Shootout (2013) as Manager (Paradise Lodge) (final film role)

English films
 The Best Exotic Marigold Hotel (2011) as Young Wasim

TV series
 Baa Bahoo Aur Baby as Narsikaka
 Bombay Blue (TV Mini-Series) as Caretaker in Episode #1.3 (1997)

 Writer
 Yeh Majhdhaar (associate writer) (1996)

References

External links
 

Indian male stage actors
Indian theatre directors
Indian male dramatists and playwrights
Gujarati theatre
Hindi theatre
2016 deaths
Gujarati people
20th-century Indian dramatists and playwrights
21st-century Indian dramatists and playwrights
1930 births
Sir Jamsetjee Jeejebhoy School of Art alumni
Indian male film actors
Gujarati-language film directors
21st-century Indian male actors
Male actors in Hindi cinema
20th-century Indian male writers
21st-century Indian male writers